BITC may refer to:

 Bitcoin, a cryptocurrency
 Burnt-in timecode, a human-readable on-screen version of the timecode information of a video stream
 Business in the Community, a United Kingdom organization promoting corporate responsibility
 Bohai International Trust Co., Ltd., Chinese trust company